The knockout phase of 1991 CONCACAF Gold Cup began on July 5, 1991, with the quarter-finals and ended on July 7, 1991, with the final at the Los Angeles Memorial Coliseum in Los Angeles, United States.

Qualified teams
The top two placed teams from each of the two groups, qualified for the knockout stage.

Bracket

Semi-finals

Honduras vs Costa Rica

United States vs Mexico

Third place play-off

Final

References

 CONCACAF